Seán McCarthy (born 12 February 1993) is an Irish rugby union player. He plays as a lock

Munster
On 18 March 2016, McCarthy made his competitive debut for Munster when he came on as a substitute against Cardiff Blues in a 2015–16 Pro12 fixture. He joined the senior Munster squad on a one-year development contract for the 2016–17 season. In April 2016, McCarthy was nominated for the John McCarthy Award for Academy Player of the Year. Having missed the entire 2016–17 season due to a knee injury, McCarthy made his comeback for Munster on 24 August 2017, when he was a replacement in the provinces 35–26 pre-season win against Worcester Warriors. He made his competitive return to action for Munster on 30 September 2017, coming off the bench against Cardiff Blues in Round 5 of the 2017–18 Pro14.

References

External links
Munster Profile
Ireland U20 Profile
Pro14 Profile

Living people
1993 births
People from Castleisland
Rugby union players from County Kerry
People educated at Rockwell College
Irish rugby union players
Shannon RFC players
Munster Rugby players
Rugby union locks